Shane Anthony Belcourt (born December 30, 1972) is a Métis writer, director, and cinematographer from Canada. He is best known for his 2007 feature film Tkaronto, which depicts the life of urban Métis and First Nations people.

Biography 

Belcourt was born in Ottawa, Ontario on December 30, 1972, to parents Tony Belcourt and Judith Pierce-Martin (née Streatch). He is the brother of graphic designer Suzanne Belcourt and painter Christi Belcourt.

The majority of his work explores and celebrates Canadian indigenous issues and culture. He wrote and directed the short films The Squeeze Box (2005) and Pookums (2006) before his debut feature film, Tkaronto, premiered at the 2007 imagineNATIVE Film and Media Arts Festival.

Following Tkaronto, he directed additional short films, including Boxed In (2009), Keeping Quiet (2010), F*%K Yeah!! (2010), Say Yes (2012) and A Common Experience (2013). He was a writer and director on Lisa Charleyboy's APTN documentary series Urban Native Girl, and codirected the television documentary Indictment: The Crimes of Shelly Chartier with Lisa Jackson for CBC Docs POV.

His second feature film, Red Rover, premiered in 2018.

His documentary film Beautiful Scars, about musician Tom Wilson and his late-life discovery of his Mohawk heritage, premiered at the 2022 Hot Docs Canadian International Documentary Festival.

References

External links 
Shane Belcourt

1972 births
Living people
Canadian Métis people
Métis filmmakers
Film directors from Ottawa
Film directors from Toronto
Writers from Ottawa
Writers from Toronto
Métis writers
21st-century Canadian screenwriters
21st-century Canadian male writers
Canadian male screenwriters
First Nations screenwriters
Canadian documentary film directors